Larbi Bourrada (called sometimes Larbi Bouraâda or Larbi Bouraada, born May 10, 1988 in Rouiba) is an Algerian decathlon athlete. He is the four-time African champion (2008, 2010, 2014 and 2018) and the African record holder in the event. He has also competed in the pole vault, winning the All-Africa Games title in 2011 and two silver medals at the African Championships. In 2012 his doping sample at a competition came back positive for the banned steroid Stanozolol, and he was given a two-year ban from athletics.

Biography
As a teenager he won the bronze medal in the decathlon at the 2007 All-Africa Games. He has been the African record in the decathlon since his performance of 8171 points at the 2009 World Championships in Athletics held in Berlin. He also finished second at the pole vault at the 2010 African Championships in Athletics with a height of 4.60 m behind Hamdi Dhouibi from Tunisia. He was Africa's representative at the 2010 IAAF Continental Cup in the high jump, pole vault and the long jump. He also set an Algerian record for the indoor heptathlon that year, scoring 5911 points as a guest athlete at the French Championships.

In July 2011 he set a new African record with a total of 8302 points at the Ratingen Combined Event meeting in Germany. He set three personal records in the competition: 100 m (10.61 s), long jump (7.94 m) and discus throw (40.34 m). He finished tenth at the 2011 Athletics World Championships in Daegu with a total of 8158 points, including two personal bests: 13.56 s in the 110 m hurdles and 4.90 m in the pole vault. He was eliminated from the decathlon in the 2011 All-Africa Games in Maputo after two false starts at the first event (100 m). The games were held two weeks after the world championships and he said that this was not enough time to recover. He entered the individual pole vault event, however, and won with a personal best of 5.00 m.

Returning to the Ratingen meeting in 2012, he again won the competition with an African record score. He set bests in the 100 metres, shot put and javelin throw to lead from start to finish and collect 8332 points. However, his doping sample at the competition came back positive for the banned steroid Stanozolol. Bourrada was disqualified from the event and given a two-year ban from athletics.

Bourrada returned to competition during the 2014 season, winning his third African title in Marrakech with a personal best and championship record score of 8311 points.

Personal bests

References

External links

Living people
1988 births
Algerian decathletes
Algerian sportspeople in doping cases
Doping cases in athletics
World Athletics Championships athletes for Algeria
Algerian male athletes
Athletes (track and field) at the 2016 Summer Olympics
Olympic athletes of Algeria
Algerian male pole vaulters
African Games gold medalists for Algeria
African Games medalists in athletics (track and field)
Athletes (track and field) at the 2011 All-Africa Games
Athletes (track and field) at the 2019 African Games
African Games bronze medalists for Algeria
African Championships in Athletics winners
African Games gold medalists in athletics (track and field)
21st-century Algerian people
20th-century Algerian people